Mayo River State Park is a state park of Virginia located in Henry County, along the North and South Forks of the Mayo River.  The entrance to the park is located in Spencer. The park is located along the Virginia-North Carolina state line, and it is adjacent to a similarly named park in North Carolina.

History
In May 2003, the North Carolina General Assembly authorized a state park along the Mayo River, from the Virginia-North Carolina state line, to the river's confluence with the Dan River.

In 2007 the Virginia General Assembly commissioned a feasibility study for creation of a state park from its Department of Conservation and Recreation (DCR). The study concluded that a park was feasible and proposed the North and South Mayo Rivers as candidates for inclusion in the state's scenic river system.

The North Mayo River, from Route 695 to the North Carolina line, and the South Mayo River, from the Patrick County line to the North Carolina line, were added to the Virginia Scenic Rivers Program in 2008.

In August 2009, DCR acquired a  tract, as its first land purchase for the park.

In 2013, North Carolina sold to Virginia portions of property it had acquired for its state park, which crossed the state line.

In 2019, Virginia acquired 214 acres with the assistance of the Piedmont Land Conservancy.

Ground was broken for park facilities in October, 2021, with a planned opening in 2022.

On Earth Day, April 22, 2022, Virginia State Parks formally opened a trailhead off Pratt Road to the public, which provides access to three hiking and cycling trails.

Recreation
The park's initial public facilities are limited to a trailhead and a  multi-use trail system.

The  Mayo River Trail is the back bone of the trail system.  It follows the park's main service road, which roughly runs along the ridge between the North and South Forks of the Mayo River, to their confluence in North Carolina.

The  Byrd’s Loop Trail creates a loop at the end of the Mayo River Trail, which runs alongside the North Mayo River.  The loop passes Byrd's Ledge, a rock formation in the river at the North Carolina-Virginia state line.  It is named after William Byrd II, who camped near it during the surveying of the line and wrote about the area.

The  Redbud Trail forms a loop in the northwest corner of the park.

References

External links
 

Protected areas of Henry County, Virginia
State parks of Virginia
Protected areas established in 2009
2009 establishments in Virginia